Novoandreyevka is the name of several rural localities Russia:
Novoandreyevka, Altai Krai, a selo in Novoandreyevsky Selsoviet of Burlinsky District
Novoandreyevka, Amur Oblast, a selo in Velikoknyazevsky Selsoviet of Belogorsky District